The St. Mary's Episcopal Church is an historic Carpenter Gothic Episcopal church located at 140 Northeast Horry Street in Madison, Florida in the United States.

Although the congregation was established in 1859, it went dormant during the American Civil War, and efforts to build a permanent church did not begin in earnest until 1879. The cornerstone was laid on August 1 of that year, and the completed church was consecrated on May 1, 1883, by John F. Young, second Bishop of Florida.

On April 28, 1997, it was added to the U.S. National Register of Historic Places.

Gallery

References

External links
 

Churches in Madison County, Florida
Episcopal church buildings in Florida
Churches on the National Register of Historic Places in Florida
Carpenter Gothic church buildings in Florida
National Register of Historic Places in Madison County, Florida
1859 establishments in Florida
Churches completed in 1881
Religious organizations established in 1859